Group A of the 2012 Africa Cup of Nations ran from 21 January until 29 January. It consisted of Equatorial Guinea, Libya, Senegal and Zambia. The matches were held at Equatorial Guinea. Zambia and Equatorial Guinea progressed to the quarterfinals.

Standings

All times are West Africa Time (UTC+1).

Equatorial Guinea vs. Libya

Assistant referees:
Songuifolo Yeo (Ivory Coast)
Jason Damoo (Seychelles)
Fourth official:
Khalid Abdel Rahman (Sudan)

Senegal vs. Zambia

Assistant referees:
Evarist Menkouande (Cameroon)
Yanoussa Moussa (Cameroon)
Fourth official:
Ali Lemghaifry (Mauritania)

Libya vs. Zambia

Assistant referees:
Balla Diarra (Mali)
Richard Bouende-Malonga (Congo)
Fourth official:
Rajindraparsad Seechurn (Mauritius)

Equatorial Guinea vs. Senegal

Assistant referees:
Moffat Champiti (Malawi)
Jean-Claude Birumushahu (Burundi)
Fourth official:
Mohamed Benouza (Algeria)

Equatorial Guinea vs. Zambia

Assistant referees:
Redouane Achik (Morocco)
Aboubacar Doumbouya (Guinea)
Fourth official:
Gehad Grisha (Egypt)

Libya vs. Senegal

Assistant referees:
Peter Edibe (Nigeria)
David Shaanika (Namibia)
Fourth official:
Ali Lemghaifry (Mauritania)

Notes

References

External links
Official website

2012 Africa Cup of Nations